Ronnie the Rhino is the mascot of Leeds Rhinos rugby league team. He gets the crowd going before the match and at half time he normally gets children involved by playing some sort of game. Ronnie the Rhino visits schools as part of the Leeds Rhinos Community project, with the intention of promoting sports and healthy living. Former "Ronnie" Daniel Duffy stood for Leeds North West in the 1997 general election, obtaining 232 votes.

In 2001 it was reported how the man inside Ronnie Rhino had defected to become Bradford Bulls' mascot 'Bull Boy'.

References 

Leeds Rhinos
English mascots
Fictional rhinoceroses
Animal mascots